Khvor Khvoreh or Khowr Khowreh or Khowrkhowreh or Khur Khureh, also rendered as Khoorkhoreh or Khorkhoreh or Khor Khowreh or Khor Kurreh, may refer to various places in Iran:
 Khvor Khvoreh, Bijar, Kurdistan Province
 Khor Khowreh, Sanandaj, Kurdistan Province
 Khvor Khvoreh, Saqqez, Kurdistan Province
 Khvor Khvoreh, Qazvin
 Khvor Khvoreh, Bukan, West Azerbaijan Province
 Khvor Khvoreh, Mahabad, West Azerbaijan Province
 Khvor Khvoreh, Salmas, West Azerbaijan Province
 Khvor Khvoreh Rural District (disambiguation)